Guillaume Latour (born 15 March 1981) is a French violinist. He plays on a violin by Jean-Baptiste Vuillaume dated 1830.

Life 
Born in Les Lilas, Latour began studying the violin at the age of 7. He first studied at the Bayonne music school, then at the Conservatoire de Bordeaux with Micheline Lefebvre. In 1999, he joined the Conservatoire de Paris in Olivier Charlier's class. He also studied musical analysis, composition and conducting.

Between 2006 and 2012, he held the position of concertmaster at the Toulon Opera and then became a member of the Diotima Quartet. During this same period his international career accelerated and he performed in about a hundred concerts per year throughout Europe,  in the United States, in Asia , South America and North Africa.

His collaborations with current composers are numerous. He premieres pieces and collaborates with Gérard Pesson Alberto Posadas, Helmut Lachenmann, Pierre Boulez, Brian Ferneyhough, Georg Friedrich Haas.

In 2014, he decided to leave the Diotima Quartet to devote himself to personal artistic projects and his career as a soloist and chamber musician.

Latour performed as soloist or chamber musician in the most prestigious venues: Berliner Philharmonie, Suntory Hall in Tokyo, Forbidden City Hall in Beijing, Wigmore Hall in London, Teatro Nacional de Madrid, Teatro Colón in Buenos Aires, Library of Congress in Washington, Philharmonie de Paris...

In 2017, after years of collaboration, concerts and tours, he created the VV duo with the cellist and drummer , aka Titi.

Discography 
 2013: Schubert, quintette à 2 violoncelles - Diotima Quartet, Anne Gastinel (Naïve Records)
 2014: Paris (title: La Parisienne) - Zaz (Play On (label))
 2015: Livre pour quatuor revisé – Pierre Boulez, Diotima Quartet (Megadisc)
 2016: A Présent - Vincent Delerm (Tôt ou tard)
 2016: Box 5 CDs: Schönberg / Berg / Webern – Diotima Quartet (Naïve Records)
 2016: Autour de Chet (Title: My Funny Valentine) (Verve Records)

Film music 
 2016: Up for Love – Title Freed from desire
 2017:  – Title Cette blessure (Universal Music Group)

Prizes and awards

Discographic awards 
 Choc Classica 2015 for the record Livre pour quatuor revisé – Pierre Boulez, Diotima Quartet (2015, Megadisc)
 "ffff" Télérama for the record Livre pour quatuor revisé – Pierre Boulez, Diotima Quartet (2015, Megadisc)
 Coup de cœur of the Académie Charles-Cros for the disk Livre quatuor revisé – Pierre Boulez, Diotima Quartet (2015, Megadisc)

International competitions

As soloist 
 First prize in the international competition of Morocco 
 First prize in the competition for young violinists Radio France "Royaume de la Musique"

In duo/trio 
 Prix ProMusicis (with pianist Célimène Daudet)
 Second prize in the Charles Hennin International Competition (in trio with Pierre-François Dufour and Véronique Goudin)
 First prize in the international Pianello Val Tidone competition (in trio with Pierre-François Dufour and Véronique Goudin)

References

External links 
 Discography on Discogs
 Guillaume Latour and Célimène Daudet – Debussy – Sonata for violin and piano (YouTube)

1981 births
Living people
People from Les Lilas
Conservatoire de Paris alumni
21st-century French male classical violinists